Calliotropis echidna is a species of sea snail, a marine gastropod mollusk in the family Eucyclidae.

Description
The shell can grow to be 6 mm in length.

Distribution
This marine species occurs in the Arafura Sea, and off New Caledonia and East Australia at depths between 115 m and 229 m.

References

 Vilvens C. (2007) New records and new species of Calliotropis from Indo-Pacific. Novapex 8 (Hors Série 5): 1–72.

External links

echidna
Gastropods described in 1994